The 1956 Western Australian state election was held on 7 April 1956.

Retiring Members

Labor

 Harry McCulloch (MLA) (Hannans)
 Herbert Styants (MLA) (Kalgoorlie)

LCL

 George Yates (MLA) (South Perth)
 Florence Cardell-Oliver (MLA) (Subiaco)

Country

 Victor Doney (MLA) (Narrogin)

Legislative Assembly
Sitting members are shown in bold text. Successful candidates are highlighted in the relevant colour. Where there is possible confusion, an asterisk (*) is also used.

See also
 Members of the Western Australian Legislative Assembly, 1953–1956
 Members of the Western Australian Legislative Assembly, 1956–1959
 1956 Western Australian Legislative Council election
 1956 Western Australian state election

References
 

Candidates for Western Australian state elections